Highlands Christian College, formerly Christian Outreach College Toowoomba, is an independent, co-educational, Christian day school, located 15 505 Hume Street, Kearneys Spring, Toowoomba, Queensland, Australia, which offers education from prep through grade 12. Highlands is a private school which caters for approximately 550 students.

History
The school was established as Christian Outreach College Toowoomba in 1982 at the back of Highlands Church, which was founded in 1978.

General information
The College is divided into four 'house groups' - Finney (Red) Liddell (Yellow), Booth (Green), and Wesley (Blue). These house groups compete to create interest and encourage interest and involvement in different athletic events held throughout the year.
Each grade or year level is divided up into Pastoral Care (PC) groups. In these groups meet in mornings to discuss upcoming events and announcements, and for the teacher to provide general support to students, and allows for the students to create bonds with their peers.
On a nominated day of the week, all students participate in sporting or athletic activities for a minimum of 2 hours.
Students are divided into Primary and Secondary Schools. These divisions have heads who oversee activities and curriculum throughout the year
Annually, the college participates in many extra-curricular activities such as TSSS level sporting and athletics, Science and Engineering Challenge, Eisteddfods, school camps, and excursions.

References

External links

Schools in Toowoomba
Educational institutions established in 1982
1982 establishments in Australia
Toowoomba